

Highest-grossing films

List of films
A list of films produced in Japan in 2010 (see 2010 in film):

References

 2010 in Japan
 2010 in Japanese television
 List of 2010 box office number-one films in Japan

2010
Japanese
Fil